Gracey may refer to:

Gracey (surname)
Gracey (singer)
Gracey (novel), by James Moloney
Gracey, Kentucky, an unincorporated town in Christian County
Gracey, Ohio, an unincorporated community
Gracey (Leontine) Elementary School, in Merced, California

See also
Gracie (disambiguation)
Gracy (disambiguation)